Artificial Intelligence Laboratory may refer to:

 Kiev Laboratory for Artificial Intelligence, a research institute in Kiev, Ukraine
 MIT Computer Science and Artificial Intelligence Laboratory, an interdisciplinary research entity at the Massachusetts Institute of Technology
 Stanford Artificial Intelligence Laboratory, the artificial intelligence research laboratory of Stanford University